Chengara Veetil Devan Nair  (5 August 1923 – 6 December 2005), also known as C. V. Devan Nair and better known simply as Devan Nair, was a Malaysian-Singaporean politician who served as the third president of Singapore from 1981 until his resignation in 1985.

Nair was a communist as a young adult, having been affiliated with the Malayan Communist Party. He harboured anti-colonial sentiments and aspired self-determination of Singapore, which was then a British colony. These caused him to be detained by the British colonial authorities in 1951. In 1954, he joined the People's Action Party, which was more leftist at the time. He was detained again in 1956, and remained so until the PAP won the 1959 general election and helped secure his release.

During his parliamentary career, Nair was the Member of Parliament (MP) for the Malaysian constituency of Bangsar between 1964 and 1969 and for the Singapore constituency of Anson between 1979 and 1981. Prior to his presidency, Nair was Secretary-General of the People's Action Party of Malaya prior to Singapore's expulsion from Malaysia, and continued to serve after the expulsion under its new name Democratic Action Party (DAP) until 1967.

Back in Singapore, Nair echoed his leftist beliefs by becoming involved in the labour movement, serving as Secretary-General of the National Trade Union Congress between 1970 and 1979. Nair lived out his final years in Hamilton, Canada, when he died there at the age of 82 of dementia.

Early life and education
Born on 5 August 1923 in Malacca, Nair was the son of a rubber plantation clerk, Illathu Veettil Karunakaran Nair, who was originally from Thalassery, Kerala, India. 

Nair and his family migrated to Singapore when he was ten years old and he received his primary education at Rangoon Road Primary School before enrolling into Victoria School for his secondary education where he passed his Senior Cambridge examination in 1940.

After the Second World War, Nair became a teacher at St Joseph's Institution and later, at St Andrew's School. In 1949, he became General-Secretary of the Singapore Teachers' Union. His disdain for colonial rule was apparent in those days, as he changed the lyrics of Rule Britannia to anti-British ones in a school choir performance before a British guest-of-honour.

Career

Anti-imperialism beliefs
Initially, a member of the Communist Anti-British League, he joined Lee Kuan Yew's People's Action Party (PAP) in 1954. Nair had been detained in 1951 by the British for anti-colonial activities. In 1955, Nair contested the 1955 Singaporean general election but lost—becoming the only PAP candidate who did not get elected.

In 1956, he was detained again under the Preservation of Public Security Ordinance Act together with trade unionists Lim Chin Siong and James Puthucheary as suspected communist subversives after the Chinese middle schools riots. Nair was released in 1959 when the PAP won the 1959 Singaporean general election in a landslide victory. He was subsequently appointed political secretary to the Minister for Education. He returned to teaching after a year. In 1960, he became Chairman of the Prisons Inquiry Commission and launched the Adult Education Board.

Joining the People's Action Party
He was the only PAP member contested in the 1964 Malaysian general election and won Bangsar, near Kuala Lumpur. This contrasted with his 1955 election defeat. He stayed in Malaysia after the separation, forming the Democratic Action Party (DAP), but returned to Singapore to lead the National Trades Union Congress (NTUC), the labour union movement which he helped to established in 1961. Nair and P. P. Narayanan were advocates for the concerns of developing countries and voiced their concerns at the ICFTU as they saw economic and social policy documents that were biased towards industrialized nations. They wanted greater attention paid to extreme poverty, unemployment and underdevelopment of their countries. These proposals were accepted and later reflected in the work of ICFTU's Economic and Social Committee.

Presidency
He entered the Parliament of Singapore in 1979 by winning the Anson seat in a by-elections and retained the seat in the 1980 general election, but resigned the seat in 1981 to accept the largely ceremonial office of President. This resulted in a by-elections of the Anson seat which was then won by opposition leader J. B. Jeyaretnam, the first time in Singapore since 1963 when an opposition party candidate won a parliamentary seat.

Resignation
On 28 March 1985, Nair suddenly resigned in unclear circumstances. Deputy Prime Minister Goh Chok Tong stated in Parliament that Nair resigned to get treatment for his alcoholism, a charge Nair hotly denied. According to Nair's counterclaim, he resigned under pressure when their political views came into conflict and Goh threatened him during a game of chess to oust him as president. Nair also alleged that he was fed drugs to make him appear disoriented and that rumours were spread about his personal life in an attempt to discredit him. 

However, Nair's claims were never substantiated. In 1999, an article about the case in the Canadian newspaper The Globe and Mail resulted in a libel suit by Goh. Some claimed that the suit was thrown out of court after Nair's counterclaim. However, in a letter to The New York Times, it is said that Goh agreed to discontinue the suit only when two of Nair's sons issued a statement, reported in The Globe and Mail on 1 July 2004, maintaining that Nair was no longer mentally competent to give evidence in court. The Globe and Mail statement concluded that "having reviewed the records, and on the basis of the family's knowledge of the circumstances leading to Mr. Nair's resignation as President of Singapore in March 1985, we can declare that there is no basis for this allegation (of Mr. Nair being drugged)."

Death and legacy
After his resignation as President, Nair and his wife migrated first to the United States in 1988 where they settled in Gaithersburg, Maryland. Then later they moved to Bloomington, Indiana. The couple later moved to Hamilton, Ontario, Canada, where they lived for the rest of their lives. His wife, Avadai Dhanam Lakshimi, died on 18 April 2005 in Hamilton, whilst Nair, who had developed severe dementia, died on 6 December of the same year as his wife in Hamilton, Canada.

Devan Nair Institute
Despite his unorthodox end to Singaporean politics, his legacy remains highly respected in Singapore, especially in regards to his association with the labour movement. The Devan Nair Institute for Employment and Employability located in Jurong East was opened on 1 May 2014 by Prime Minister Lee Hsien Loong to recognise his contributions to the labour movement when he was Secretary-General of National Trades Union Congress. The goal of the institution is to establish a network for workers and employers seeking employment and employability solutions in Singapore.

Family
Nair is survived by his daughter, three sons, and five grandchildren. 

His eldest son, Janadas Devan, was a senior editor with The Straits Times and is currently Chief of Government Communications at the Ministry of Communications and Information (MCI) and also a director at the public policy think-tank Institute of Policy Studies (IPS). Janadas Devan is married to literary scholar Geraldine Heng. 

His second son, Janamitra Devan, was the former Vice-President of the International Finance Corporation, and the World Bank. 

His third son, Janaprakash Devan died in 2009. 

His only daughter, Vijaya Kumari Devan continues to reside in Hamilton, Ontario.

References

 Dodsworth & Brown Funeral Home (Robinson Chapel) 
 

1923 births
2005 deaths
People from Kerala
Singaporean Hindus
Presidents of Singapore
People's Action Party politicians
Members of the Cabinet of Singapore
Members of the Parliament of Singapore
Members of the Dewan Rakyat
Malaysian emigrants to Singapore
Malaysian politicians of Indian descent
Malaysian political party founders
Singaporean emigrants to Canada
Victoria School, Singapore alumni
Malayali people
Democratic Action Party (Malaysia) politicians
Malaysian people of Indian descent
Malaysian people of Malayali descent
Singaporean people of Malayali descent
Singaporean politicians of Indian descent
People who lost Malaysian citizenship
Naturalised citizens of Singapore
Singaporean people of Indian descent
Singaporean trade unionists
Deaths from dementia in Canada